Yvonne Franssen is a Canadian taekwondo practitioner. 

She won a silver medal in heavyweight at the 1989 World Taekwondo Championships in Seoul, after being defeated by Jung Wan-sook in the final. She won a silver medal in heavyweight at the 1991 World Taekwondo Championships, after being defeated by Lynnette Love in the final. She won a gold medal at the 1992 Pan American Taekwondo Championships, a silver medal in 1990, and a bronze medal in 1988.

References

External links

Year of birth missing (living people)
Living people
Canadian female taekwondo practitioners
World Taekwondo Championships medalists
Pan American Taekwondo Championships medalists
20th-century Canadian women